FWFC can refer to one of the following Scottish association football clubs:

 Fort William F.C.
 Forth Wanderers F.C.